Things Ain't What They Used to Be is an album by the First Annual Prestige Swing Festival featuring two all-star groups, one including Coleman Hawkins, Hilton Jefferson, Jimmy Hamilton and Joe Newman and the other led by Al Sears with Buddy Tate, Pee Wee Russell and Joe Thomas which was recorded in 1961 and first released on the Swingville label as a double album before being reissued as two single discs with Hawkins name prominently displayed; Things Ain't What They Used to Be and Years Ago. All tracks were also reissued as Jam Session in Swingville which was credited to Hawkins and Russell.

Reception

The AllMusic review by Scott Yanow states: "The music, which is performed by two all-star groups with arrangements by either Jimmy Hamilton or Al Sears, is generally modern swing ... Nothing all that memorable or innovative occurs, but the performances are enjoyable".

Track listing 
Disc One: Things Ain't What They Used to Be (SVLP 2024)
 "Things Ain't What They Used to Be" (Mercer Ellington, Ted Persons) – 6:48
 "Spring's Swing" (Vivian Hamilton) – 7:55
 "Phoenix" (Al Sears) – 7:16
 "Love Me or Leave Me" (Walter Donaldson, Gus Kahn) – 7:16
 "I May Be Wrong But I Think You're Wonderful" (Henry Sullivan, Harry Ruskin) – 6:33
 "Vic's Spot" (Vic Dickenson) – 3:56

Disc Two: Years Ago (SVLP 2025)
 "So Glad" (Al Sears) – 5:33
 "Cool Sunrise" (Esmond Edwards) – 10:41
 "I Want to Be Happy" (Vincent Youmans, Irving Caesar) – 2:44
 "Jammin' in Swingville" (Hamilton) – 9:32
 "Years Ago" (Dan Jones) 10:02

Personnel 
Disc One, tracks 2 & 4 and Disc Two, tracks 2 & 4
Coleman Hawkins – tenor saxophone
Jimmy Hamilton – clarinet, arranger
Joe Newman – trumpet
J. C. Higginbotham – trombone
Hilton Jefferson – alto saxophone
Claude Hopkins – piano
Tiny Grimes – guitar
Wendell Marshall – bass
Billy English – drums
Disc One, tracks 1, 3, 5 & 6 and Disc Two, tracks 1 & 5
Al Sears – tenor saxophone, arranger
Joe Thomas – trumpet
Vic Dickenson – trombone
Pee Wee Russell – clarinet
Buddy Tate – tenor saxophone 
Cliff Jackson – piano
Danny Barker – guitar
Joe Benjamin – bass
J. C. Heard – drums
Disc Two, track 3
Cliff Jackson – piano
Joe Benjamin – bass
J. C. Heard – drums

References 

1961 albums
Coleman Hawkins albums
Al Sears albums
Jimmy Hamilton albums
Swingville Records albums
Albums recorded at Van Gelder Studio
Albums produced by Esmond Edwards